Michael Carson may refer to:

 Michael Carson (author) (born 1946), pen name of British author Michael Wherly
 Michael Carson (television director) (1947–2005), Australian television director
 Michael Bear Carson and Suzan Carson, serial killers